Eureka Street is a BBC Northern Ireland 1999 adaptation to mini-series of Robert McLiam Wilson's 1996 novel of the same name. Set in Belfast in the six months before and after the 1994 ceasefire, it commences with an anonymous hand typing the words, "All stories are love stories."  The novel opens with the same text. The story follows the lives of two friends: the Catholic Jake Jackson – struggling with a failed relationship, his job as a repossession agent and the effect of the Troubles on the world around him – and the Protestant Chuckie Lurgan, "fat" and unemployed until circumstances and a previously untapped entrepreneurial spirit lead him to a world very different from Eureka Street. The adaptation was scripted by Donna Franceschild, directed by Adrian Shergold and starred Vincent Regan as Jake and Mark Benton as Chuckie.

External links

1999 British television series debuts
1999 British television series endings
1990s British drama television series
BBC television dramas
1990s British television miniseries
Television shows based on British novels
Television shows based on Irish novels
Television shows from Northern Ireland
Television series set in 1994
English-language television shows
Television shows set in Belfast
Television shows set in Northern Ireland
Television shows set in Ireland